The Gotha G.V was a heavy bomber used by the Luftstreitkräfte (Imperial German Air Service) during World War I. Designed for long-range service and built by Gothaer Waggonfabrik AG, the Gotha G.V was used principally as a night bomber.

Development 

Operational use of the Gotha G.IV demonstrated that the incorporation of the fuel tanks into the engine nacelles was a mistake. In a crash landing the tanks could rupture and spill fuel onto the hot engines. This posed a serious problem because landing accidents caused 75% of operational losses. In response Gothaer produced the G.V, which housed its fuel tanks inside the fuselage. The smaller engine nacelles were mounted on struts above the lower wing.

The Gotha G.V pilot seat was offset to port, with the fuel tanks immediately behind. This blocked the connecting walkway that previously on earlier machines allowed crew members to move between the three gun stations. All bombs were carried externally in this model.

The base variant of G.V offered no performance improvement over the G.IV. The G.V was up to 450 kg (990 lb) heavier than the G.IV due to additional equipment and the use of insufficiently seasoned timber. The Mercedes D.IVa engines could not produce the rated 190 kW (260 hp) due to inferior quality of fuel.

Gotha tunnel
The Gotha included an important innovation in the form of a "gun tunnel", whereby the underside of the rear fuselage was arched, early versions allowing placement of a rearward-facing machine gun, protecting against attack from below, removing the blind spot. Later versions expanded the tunnel to remove the lower gun, providing a slot in the upper fuselage that allowed the rear gunner to remain stationary.

Operational history
The G.V entered service in August 1917. For the performance reasons aforementioned, it generally could not operate at altitudes as high as the G.IV.

Variants

G.Va
In February 1918, Gothaer tested a compound tail unit with biplane horizontal stabilizers and twin rudders. The new tail unit, known as the Kastensteuerung, improved the aircraft's marginal directional control on one engine. The resulting G.Va subvariant incorporated the new tail, as well as a slightly shorter forward fuselage with an auxiliary nose landing gear. All 25 G.Va aircraft were delivered to Bogohl 3, the new designation for the former Kagohl 3.

G.Vb
Carried an increased payload compared to the earlier G.Va, and operated at a maximum takeoff weight of 4,550 kg (10,030 lb). To reduce the danger of flipping over during landing, Gothaer introduced the Stossfahrgestell ("shock landing gear"), a tandem two-bogie main landing gear. The Stossfahrgestell proved so good that it was fitted to all G.Vs in Bogohl 3. Some G.Vb aircraft also had Flettner servo tabs on the ailerons to reduce control forces.

Idflieg ordered 80 G.Vb aircraft, the first being delivered to Bogohl 3 in June 1918. By the Armistice, all 80 aircraft were built but the last batch did not reach the front and was delivered direct to the Allied special commission.

Operators

Luftstreitkräfte

Specifications (Gotha G.V)

See also

References

Bibliography

1910s German bomber aircraft
G.V
Aircraft first flown in 1917